The Speaker is  the presiding officer of the Kenyan National Assembly. From 1966 to 2013 the National Assembly was the unicameral body of the Kenyan Parliament.

Qualifications
The Speaker is elected by the National Assembly (Kenya) from among persons who are qualified to be Members of the Parliament. The Speaker's term lasts for a period of five years, and primarily comes to an end when a new house of parliament first meets after an election in line with Article 106 of the Constitution of Kenya

Speakers of the National Assembly of Kenya

Bicameral parliament
Previously, there were separate Speakers of the Senate and the House of Representatives.

Speaker of the House of Representatives
Sir Humphrey Slade (1963–1966)
Source:

Speaker of the Senate
Timothy Chitasi Muinga Chokwe (1963–1966)
Ekwee Ethuro (2013-2017)
Ken Lusaka (2017–2022)
Amason Kingi (2022–present)
Source:

Speaker of the Colonial Legislative Council
William K. Horne (1948–1955)
Ferdinand W. Cavendish-Bentinck (1955–1960)
Sir Humphrey Slade (1960–1963)

References

Kenya, National Assembly
Speakers